Caminibacter mediatlanticus is a Gram-negative, anaerobic, chemolithoautotrophic, thermophilic bacterium from the genus of Caminibacter which has been isolated from a hydrothermal vent from the Mid-Atlantic Ridge.

References 

Campylobacterota
Bacteria described in 2005